Setter is a type of gundog.

Setter or Setters may also refer to:
Bone setter
 Setter (computer science), usage of the term in object-oriented programming
Setter (volleyball), volleyball position
Setter (crossword), the British crossword compiler
Setters (film), a 2019 Indian Hindi-language crime thriller film

HMS Setter
Setter Hill (disambiguation)
Setter (surname)

See also

Maurice Setters (born 1936), English football player and manager